"What He Didn't Do" is a song recorded by American country music artist Carly Pearce. It was released on June 13, 2022 as the third single from her third studio album 29: Written in Stone. Pearce co-wrote the song with Ashley Gorley and Emily Shackelton.

An acoustic version of the song was released on November 18, 2022.

Background 
Pearce co-wrote the song with Gorley and Shackleton in late 2020, following her divorce from Michael Ray. Upon Pearce first playing the song, it would pick up a large reception among fans. It eventually became the third single from the album 29: Written in Stone, after radio stations had also inquired about it.

Content 
The song describes a breakup from a female perspective, listing off everything the male lover "didn't do" in the relationship, rather than detailing what he did to end it.

Chart performance 
Before the song's release as a single, it charted on Hot Country Songs at number 43. Upon release, it would debut at number 53 on Country Airplay. It has since peaked at 6.

Charts

Weekly charts

Year-end charts

Certifications

References 

2022 singles
2021 songs
Carly Pearce songs
Songs written by Ashley Gorley
Songs written by Carly Pearce
Songs written by Emily Shackelton
Song recordings produced by Shane McAnally
Big Machine Records singles